= Bassam Halaka =

Austrian-Egyptian composer and musician

Bassam Halaka (born 6 April 1977 in Kuwait) is an Austrian-Egyptian composer and musician based in Vienna, Austria. His work includes instrumental, orchestral, chamber and electronic music.

== Life and education ==
Halaka was born in Kuwait and grew up in Cairo, Egypt. He studied music in Egypt, including cello, singing and composition.

In 2009, he moved to Austria and continued his musical studies at the Joseph Haydn Conservatory in Eisenstadt. He later studied computer music at the Institute of Electronic Music and Acoustics (IEM) of the University of Music and Performing Arts Graz (KUG), where he obtained a Master of Arts degree.

== Musical career ==
Halaka works as a composer and musician. His compositions encompass instrumental and electronic music, including orchestral, chamber, choral and audiovisual works. His musical background and activities in Austria were featured in a 2013 report by ORF Burgenland.

He has been associated with several musical and cultural organisations and projects in Austria. His biography was also included in the EU-Art-Network publication Cahier d'art 2017, published in 2018.

Halaka is also listed in connection with the Austrian Composers Association (Österreichischer Komponistenbund).
